Hej, ženo is the fourth studio album of Montenegrin singer Šako Polumenta, which was released in 1997.

Track listing 
 U ljubavi svi su grešni
 Eh da mogu majko
 Šta mi to treba
 Slab sam na tebe ja
 Iza brave
 Neko se rodi da bude srećan
 Nosi joj sudbino
 Ni na nebu, ni na zemlji
 Gde si ti, gde sam ja
 Hej, ženo

1997 albums
Šako Polumenta albums